RCDC may refer to:
 Robot Chicken DC Comics Special
 Royal Canadian Dental Corps
 Royal College of Dentists of Canada